There are over 9000 Grade I listed buildings in England.  This page is a list of these buildings in the county of Shropshire, by district.

Shropshire

|}

Telford and Wrekin

|}

See also
Grade I listed churches in Shropshire
:Category:Grade I listed buildings in Shropshire

Notes

References 
National Heritage List for England

External links

 
Lists of Grade I listed buildings in Shropshire